Clem Rogers McSpadden (November 9, 1925 – July 7, 2008) was an American rodeo announcer and politician. A member of the Democratic Party, he served as a U.S. Representative from Oklahoma's 2nd Congressional District for one full term from 1973 to 1975. Prior to his election to the U.S. House, McSpadden was a member of the Oklahoma Senate between 1954 and 1972. He was the grandnephew of Oklahoma comedian and actor Will Rogers.

Early life
McSpadden was born on a ranch near the small town of Bushyhead in Rogers County, Oklahoma. He grew up on a ranch owned by Will Rogers in nearby Oologah, where he attended public schools. He served in the United States Navy during World War II (1944–1946). He attended the University of Redlands, North Texas Agricultural College, and the University of Texas before he received his Bachelor of Science degree in 1948 from Oklahoma State University–Stillwater, then known as Oklahoma A&M.

Career
He was first elected to public office in November 1954 when he won a seat in the Oklahoma Senate. He served in that body until 1972, including leading it for two sessions as President pro tempore of the Oklahoma Senate.

He was elected to the Ninety-third Congress in November 1972, and served one term (January 3, 1973 – January 3, 1975), serving on the House Rules Committee. He chose to run for Governor of Oklahoma in 1974 rather than seek reelection for a second congressional term. His gubernatorial candidacy was unsuccessful, as David L. Boren, later a United States senator and the president of the University of Oklahoma, received the Democratic nomination instead.

McSpadden was involved in rodeos throughout North America as a broadcaster, including the National Finals Rodeo in Las Vegas, Nevada, the Calgary Stampede, and the Canadian Finals Rodeo. In 1974, he hired a then unknown Reba McEntire to sing the National Anthem at the National Rodeo Finals. He was quoted by the Tulsa World as observing "an amazing correlation" between politics and the rodeo profession, "in that there's bull in each profession." He is also known, especially through the rodeo community, for his authorship of "A Cowboy's Prayer."

Honors 
 Rodeo Hall of Fame of the National Cowboy and Western Heritage Museum 1989
 ProRodeo Hall of Fame 1990
Oklahoma Hall of Fame 1990
Oklahoma Sports Hall of Fame 2009
 Legends of ProRodeo Hall of Fame 2008
 Legend in the Bull Riding Hall of Fame 2017

Death and legacy
After being diagnosed with cancer, McSpadden died at the M.D. Anderson Cancer Center in Houston on July 7, 2008.

A portion of Oklahoma State Highway 66 between Claremore and Bushyhead was designated Clem McSpadden Highway in 1985. The post office in Chelsea, Oklahoma, where he made his home, was renamed the "Clem Rogers McSpadden Post Office Building" in his honor in January 2008.

See also

 List of Native Americans in the United States Congress

References

External links

1925 births
2008 deaths
People from Rogers County, Oklahoma
Native American members of the United States Congress
Democratic Party Oklahoma state senators
United States Navy officers
United States Navy personnel of World War II
Oklahoma State University alumni
Ranchers from Oklahoma
Deaths from cancer in Texas
Cherokee Nation members of the United States House of Representatives
Democratic Party members of the United States House of Representatives from Oklahoma
20th-century American politicians
ProRodeo Hall of Fame inductees
Rodeo announcers
20th-century Native Americans
21st-century Native Americans